Heinz Arnold (12 February 1919 – 17 April 1945) was a German Luftwaffe fighter ace. He is credited with 49 aerial victories including seven victories claimed flying the Messerschmitt Me 262 jet fighter.

Career
Arnold joined the Luftwaffe in September 1939, training for a technical role with the Kampffliegerschule at Tutow. Arnold began flying training in January 1940 with Flieger Ausbildungs Rgt. 12., before advanced training with Jagdfliegerschule 5 in late 1940.

Arnold was then posted to Jagdgeschwader 5 on the Arctic Front. As part of the group expansion from three Staffeln per Gruppe to four Staffeln per Gruppe, Arnold's 7. Staffel was re-designated and became the 10. Staffel of JG 5 on 15 August. At the same time, the Staffel was placed under command of Leutnant Walter Schuck. On 26 September, defending against an attack on Vardø, Arnold claimed three Yakovlev Yak-9 fighters shot down, taking his total to 40 aerial victories.

Flying the Messerschmitt Me 262

Jagdgeschwader 7 "Nowotny" (JG 7—7th Fighter Wing) "Nowotny" was created from the experimental unit Kommando Nowotny in November 1944 and was equipped with the then revolutionary new Messerschmitt Me 262 jet aircraft. JG 7 was placed under the command of Oberst Johannes Steinhoff. On 19 November, remnants of Kommando Nowotny was redesignated at Lechfeld Airfield to III. Gruppe of JG 7 and ordered to Brandenburg-Briest where they joined the Stab (headquarters unit). In consequence, the 1., 2. and 3. Staffel of Kommando Nowotny became the 9., 10, and 11. Staffel of III. Gruppe which Steinhoff had placed under the command of Major Erich Hohagen. There, Arnold was assigned to 11. Staffel. At the time, the Staffel was commanded by Oberleutnant Günther Wegmann. From March to April 1945, he claimed seven aerial victories flying the Me 262 jet-fighter in Defense of the Reich, making him one of the top jet-aces of the war.

On 3 March 29 Me 262s from Stab and III. Gruppe intercepted United States Army Air Forces (USAAF) heavy bombers heading for Magdeburg, Hannover, Hildesheim and Braunschweig. Near Magdeburg, Me 262s from 10. and 11. Staffel intercepted the bombers of the 2nd Air Division and 3rd Air Division. During this encounter, Arnold claimed a Boeing B-17 Flying Fortress bomber and an escorting Republic P-47 Thunderbolt fighter shot down. On 18 March, Wegmann, the commander of 11. Staffel was wounded in combat. In consequence, Leutnant Karl Schnörrer was given command of the Staffel. The next day, Me 262s led by Schnörrer intercepted 374 B-17 bombers of the 3rd Air Division heading for the Carl Zeiss AG optical factories at Jena. On this mission, Arnold claimed a B-17 bomber shot down.

Arnold's Me 262 A-1a (Werknummer 500491—factory number) "Yellow 7" was unserviceable at Alt Lönnewitz when, on 17 April 1945, Arnold took a replacement Me 262 A-1a into an action from which he failed to return. Arnold went missing in action during a ground-attack mission in the Thuringian Forest area of Germany. Alternatively, Arnold may have been shot down by First Lieutenant James A. Steiger from the 357th Fighter Group during an attack on a B-17 of the 305th Bombardment Group on a mission to bomb Berlin.

His Me 262 (Werknummer 500491) bearing his personal victory marks is now on display at the Smithsonian Institution, Washington, D.C., USA.

Aerial victory claims
Mathews and Foreman, authors of Luftwaffe Aces – Biographies and Victory Claims, researched the German Federal Archives and state that Arnold was credited with 48 aerial victories. This figure includes 41 claims made on the Eastern Front and seven on the Western Front, including five four-engined bombers, flying the Me 262 jet fighter.

Victory claims were logged to a map-reference (PQ = Planquadrat), for example "PQ 37 Ost PC-4/8". These sectors were then subdivided into 36 smaller units to give a location area 3 × 4 km in size.

Notes

References

Citations

Bibliography

 
 
 
 
 
 
 
 
 
 

1919 births
1945 deaths
People from Flöha
Luftwaffe pilots
German World War II flying aces
Aviators killed by being shot down
Luftwaffe personnel killed in World War II